Telenor may refer to:

Telenor, a Norwegian telecommunications company
Telenor Arena, a multi-purpose indoor arena in Norway, sponsored by Telenor
Telenor Arena Karlskrona, a multi-purpose sporting arena in Sweden, sponsored by Telenor
Nykøbing Falster Idrætspark, a stadium previous named Telenor Arena, sponsored by Telenor, between July 2012 and July 2014
Telenor Avidi, former subsidiary of Telenor
Telenor Maritim Radio, a maritime telecommunication services company owned by Telenor
Telenor Bulgaria, a former subsidiary of Telenor
Telenor Denmark, a subsidiary of Telenor
Telenor Hungary, a former subsidiary of Telenor
Telenor India, a subsidiary of Telenor
Telenor Montenegro, a former subsidiary of Telenor
Telenor Myanmar, a subsidiary of Telenor
Telenor Pakistan, a subsidiary of Telenor
Telenor Serbia, a former subsidiary of Telenor
Telenor Sverige, a subsidiary of Telenor